Fisher Spur is a rugged rock spur jutting northward from the west flank of the Daniels Range immediately north of Mount Nero, in the Usarp Mountains of Antarctica. It was mapped by the United States Geological Survey from surveys and U.S. Navy air photos, 1960–63, and was named by the Advisory Committee on Antarctic Names for Dean F. Fisher, a United States Antarctic Research Program geophysicist at McMurdo Station, 1967–68.

References 

Ridges of Oates Land